A Fistful of Death is a 1971 Italian Western film directed by Demofilo Fidani and starring Klaus Kinski.

Cast
 Hunt Powers as Butch Cassidy
 Klaus Kinski as Reverend Cotton
 Gordon Mitchell as Ironhead
 Jeff Cameron as Macho Callaghan
 Philip Garner as Sundance Kid
 Dennis Colt as Buck O'Sullivan
 Lucky McMurray
 Grazia Giuvi as Saloon-Girl
 Paul Crain as Member of gang
 Giuseppe Polidori
 Pietro Fumelli
 Manlio Salvatori
 Alessandro Perrella
 Custer Gail
 Giglio Gigli
 Lorenzo Arbore

References

External links

1971 films
1971 Western (genre) films
1970s Italian-language films
Spaghetti Western films
Films directed by Demofilo Fidani
Films scored by Lallo Gori
1970s Italian films